The Caisse des dépôts et consignations (CDC) is a French public sector financial institution created in 1816, and part of the government institutions under the control of the Parliament. Often described as the "investment arm" of the French State, it is defined in the French Monetary and Financial Code as a "public group serving the public interest" and a "long-term investor". Since 2017, Éric Lombard has served as its CEO.

Areas of intervention
As set out within the French Monetary and Financial Code, the Caisse des dépôts et consignations carries out missions of public interest in support of the public policies implemented by the State and local government bodies.
It contributes to the development of enterprises in line with its own proprietorial interests, and may also exercise competitive activities. 
It ensures, on behalf of the State and local authorities, missions of general interest:
Management of the regulated savings funds (Livret A, LDD, etc.) and financing of social housing through these funds;
Management of pension plans (47 institutions in management, more than 75,000 employers, a total management of a retiree in five);
Management of public authority (European funds, register of greenhouse gases);
Banking management of the French public justice system (notaries, receivers, judicial representatives...) and of Social Security (including consignment);
Key stakeholder and provider of funding for the urban policy;
Supporting universities in their projects and providing funding for their autonomy;
Financing the development of TPE (very small businesses, microcredit) and small and medium enterprises (SMEs) through BpiFrance;
Promoting research (I4CE, Novethic) and financing sustainable development;
Developing territories alongside local authorities (13 regional offices in the country and overseas);
Long-term institutional investor;

Subsidiaries

All the subsidiaries are presented with CDC's ownership percentage and, if applicable, the French State's.
 
Public Investment Bank:
Bpifrance S.A. (French State 50%, CDC 50%): Development of shareholding and funding for SMEs
Insurance:
CNP Assurances 41% before march 4th 2020, 0% since (ceded to La Banque Postale, "La Poste" Group): Personal Risk insurer
Postal & banking network:
La Poste (French state 74% / CDC 26%): Local banking and postal services
Real Estate:
 SNI 100%: Social real estate
 Exterimmo: 100% : financing of energy retrofitting for public buildings
 Icade 39%: Real estate
Services:
 CDC Arkhineo 100%: archiving and long-term conservation of electronic data 
 Transdev 70% Transportation
 Egis 75% Construction engineering
 SCET 100% : Project engineering company
 Compagnie des Alpes 40% : Leisure and accommodation
 Belambra clubs 34%: Leisure and accommodation 
 France Brevet 50% CDC, 50% French State: Patent monetization and investment fund

International presence
Independently of the presence of the operational subsidiaries, the Caisse des Dépôts group ensures an institutional presence internationally. Caisse des Dépôts develops bilateral and multilateral relations with partner institutions which allow for the promotion of long-term investment and the development of investment projects in France and abroad, particularly in projects relating to the energy transition.

Activities in Europe
The European level takes on a crucial importance for the Caisse des Dépôts group taking into account the drive and influence of the European Union on investments and public interventions in France.

Promotion of long-term investment
Since the Financial crisis of 2007–08, Caisse des Dépôts, along with other public financial institutions in the European Union, has undertaken the promotion of the specific model of asset management with a long term horizon. In 2009, Caisse des Dépots, Cassa Depositi e Prestiti, the European Investment Bank and Kreditanstalt für Wiederaufbau (KfW) created the Long Term Investors Club (LTIC) with the aim of bringing together worldwide institutions to emphasis common identity as long-term investors, to encourage cooperation and to foster appropriate conditions for long-term investments. Today the Long-Term investors Club gathers 18 financial institutions and institutional investors mainly from G20 countries, representing a combined balance sheet total of USD 5.4 trillion. Also in 2011, Caisse des Dépôts and other institutional investors held a national summit on long-term investment in France. From the summit a Report was drafted and it gained momentum in the financial establishment. This led to the creation of the "task force of the Paris stock exchange on long term investment" under the guidance of former financial director of AXA insurance company Gerard de la Martiniere. Still active today, the task force is dedicated to the promotion of the model of long term investment to the institutions of the European Union on a regulatory, fiscal, accounting and prudential level. After the publication of the European Commission Green Paper on the long-term financing of the economy, in July 2013, Caisse des Dépôts, together with the European members of the Long Term investors Club, cofounded the European Long Term investors Association. This association allows for the undertaking of joint actions in order to highlight this specific investor model with public stakeholders and the European Union.The Eltia gathers 27 European long-term financial institutions. With a combined balance sheet of €2.45 trillion, ELTIA's goal is to promote long-term investment in alignment with the objectives and initiatives developed by the European Union. Caisse des Dépôts also contributes to the work of the European Parliament Intergroup on long term investment and reindustrialisation which was implemented at the start of the election of the European Parliament in 2014.

Public investment stakeholder in Europe
Marguerite Fund
Caisse des Dépôts is one of the investors brought together in the Marguerite Fund which combines the contributions from public institutions (CDC, KfW, CdP, etc.) to create investments in Europe. The first achievements were put into operation from 2014 and the investment programme will be completed in 2016.

Participation to the "Investment Plan for Europe" launched by the Commission Juncker (2014–2019)
As a National Promotional Institution (NPI) from the European Union, Caisse des Dépôts is in partnership with the European Investment Bank and the European Commission in the implementation of the European Commission Investment Plan for Europe. As such Caisse des Dépôts has committed to provide €8 billion in the form of loans, equity and guarantees to projects under financing from the European Fond for Strategic Investment (EFSI), enhancing the leverage potential of the Fund. 
Also Caisse des Dépôts contributes to the European Investment Advisory Hub (EIAH) and delivers an advisory services model along the EIB.

Activities in the world
Caisse des Dépôts maintains bilateral and multi-lateral relationships. These partnerships, historically deployed with its counterparts in Africa and the Maghreb, have also developed with institutions and public banks in China and Brazil.
In 2011, with the Moroccan CDG, Caisse des Dépôts organized the Caisse des Dépôts Global Forum which promotes long-term investment and public funding models for economic and social development. The Forum organises a biannual meeting, the last session of which was held in Tunis in April 2015.

Inframed Fund
Caisse des Dépôts is an investor in the Inframed fund launched in 2010 with other public institutions from the Mediterranean region. Inframed is targeting €385mn of investments into infrastructure development projects.

History

1816: Creation of the Caisse des Dépôts

The Caisse des Dépôts et Consignations was established in 1816 by Louis-Emmanuel Corvetto, Finance Minister under King Louis XVIII, to safeguard public funds, including the country's civil servants' pension funds and retirement accounts. According to article 110 of the French law of 28 April 1816: "Deposits, consignments and services relating to the Legion of Honour, to the channel company and to pension funds [...] will be administered by a special body under the name Caisse des Dépôts et Consignations."
The three rulings of 3 July 1816 defined the major areas of activity of the new body: consignments; voluntary deposits from individuals or public bodies and funds from the legal professions; pension funds: since 1853, Caisse des Dépôts has been managing pension funds of civil servants.
Other activities include the indemnification of settlers of Santo Domingo (1825), the management of Compagnie des quatre canaux, the management of the accounts for the Legion of Honour and financial services for the army. By law, Caisse des Dépôts uses its funds mainly to purchase public "annuities" and therefore contributes to the funding of the French state.

1822: Territorial development
Caisse des Dépôts granted its first territorial development loan for the development of the Port of Dunkirk in 1822 and acquired, again for the first time, securities issued by the Compagnie des quatre canaux. Caisse des Dépôts would then participate in funding key development and equipment stages of the country, making an important contribution to the reconstruction of France after the Second World War. The Local Authority Equipment Aid Fund (CAECL), created in 1966 to complete its funding via market funds, would give birth to the Crédit Local de France (CLF) in 1987. In 1996, the merger between Crédit Communal de Belgique and Crédit Local de France, created Dexia which is no longer part of the group.

1837: Centralisation of livrets d'épargne savings accounts
The French parliament decided that the funds collected by the local caisses d'épargne savings accounts should be centralised and employed by Caisse des Dépôts from 1837. This provision was extended to the Livret A account from La Poste during the creation of the Caisse nationale d'épargne in 1881.

1850: Pensions and personal protection
Caisse des Dépôts has been managing the Civil Service Pension Fund since 1816, and the first Old-Age Pension Fund (French acronym: CRV) since 1850, which extended the personal protection scope to a much broader section of society. The first two life insurance funds to be set up – National Insurance Fund in the event of Death (CNAD) and National Insurance Fund in the event of Accidents (CNAA) – were also managed by Caisse des Dépôts. These would merge in 1959 to become CNP (now CNP Assurances). Floated in 1998, CNP Assurances was in 2013 the number one personal insurance company in France.

1850: Investments and companies
With the broadening of its missions, Caisse des Dépôts invested the funds which were entrusted to it. From 1850, it participated in the capital of newly created railways companies. The 1931 Finance Act authorised Caisse des Dépôts to invest inflows to the savings funds in corporate shares and bonds. From 1994, it has also invested in SMEs with the SME Innovation programme, to strengthen their equity, encourage innovation and support the risk capital market. The creation of CDC Entreprises, which succeeded CDC PME created in 1998, and Qualium Investissement, created in 2004, aimed to support venture capital activity, which would be strengthened in 2007 by the creation of a new subsidiary, le Fond Stratégique Investissement (FSI). In 2013, the merger of CDC Entreprises and FSI gave birth to the Public Investment Bank.

1889: Telephony then digital
In 1889 the French state acquired the structuring of the private telephone networks, via a "contribution" from Caisse des Dépôts to the Treasury. At the end of 1930, the loans from the public body to local authorities allowed for the creation of a national telephone network. Nowadays, Caisse des Dépôts is investing in fast and superfast broadband infrastructure in France. In 2000, Caisse des Dépôts was entrusted with the creation of the cyberbase programme, the aim of which was to deploy digital public spaces over the entire French territory to encourage the development of Internet use and new information technology. Since 2003, it has been investing in the spread of Digital Work Spaces (ENT) which offers digital services to educational institutions (schools, secondary schools and universities).

1890: Mandates and deposits
Since 1890, under a mandate from the French state, Caisse des Dépôts has been receiving funds deposited by individuals at notaries (notably during inheritance or property transactions), creating a business which has developed over the 20th century. Nowadays, the scope of its missions has widened, it includes funds from administrators and legal representatives, court clerks, bailiffs, etc.. Moreover, it was entrusted with the management of new mandates like the Social Cohesion Fund (FCS) which is able to guarantee loans to natural or legal persons and also grants loans to job-seekers or social minima recipients creating their own company. Since 1816, in accordance with its role as a trusted third-party, Caisse des Dépôts has been exercising the profession of consignee, which consists of keeping sums or amounts over which legal disputes or disagreements still exist. Since 2014, it has been developing this trustee and lender business on behalf of third parties, as well as managing the Personal Training Account (CPF), dormant accounts and the Programme of investments for the future.

1905: Funding of social housing
Caisse des Dépôts granted, out of its own funds, its first loans to social housing in 1905. In 1908 the French state entrusted it with the management of its housing loans and the French law of 26 February 1921 authorised loans on savings funds for low-cost housing (HBM), prefiguring the first social housing (HLM). The French law of 1928, known as "Loi Loucheur", did not change this mission, rather it strengthened Caisse des Dépôts' role through a programme of large scale: 200,000 low-cost homes and 80,000 average rent homes. This role of funding social housing was strengthened after the Second World War by the implementation of different regulated saving centralisation systems.

1954: Creation of the first subsidiaries
Several subsidiaries were founded since 1954 : Scic, a real-estate company in 1954 (it became Icade in 2003), Scet in 1955, a service provision cluster for the local semi-public companies (SEM) for spatial planning, VVF in 1958, specialising in social and family tourism and finally Scetauroute in 1970, in the industry of motorway facilities . The development of services has since widened to the public transport sector for passengers with Transdev in 1990, to engineering infrastructure with Egis in 1998 (via the merger of Scetauroute and other engineering subsidiaries) and lastly to the business of ski and leisure park operation with the Compagnie des Alpes in 1989. In 2004, Caisse des Dépôts acquired all the equity of the Société Nationale Immobilière (SNI), which became the number one social landlord in France.

1960: Decentralisation
Since 1960, the public body has been decentralised into 25 regional managements which implement the group's strategy on the ground. From January 2016, in accordance with the 2015 territorial reform, there are 13 regional managements.

1966: Environment
In 1966, Caisse des Dépôts has created the Société Forestière (Forestry Company). Since 2000, it has been producing various studies on climate research (CDC Climat and Novethic). In 2005, Caisse des Dépôts was behind the creation of the European Carbon Fund and the implementation of the national register of greenhouse gas emission quotas. In 2008, Caisse des Dépôts put in place a "compensation fund for biodiversity" via its specialised subsidiary CDC Biodiversité.

Governance

The Supervisory Committee

The Supervisory Committee exercises oversight in particular with regard to strategic policies, the administration of savings funds and the preparation of the financial statements (certified by the Statutory Auditors). The Supervisory Committee is composed of members of the Parliamentary Finance Committee, members of the Council of state and of the Court of Auditors, the Governor of the Banque de France (Central Bank), the Director of the French Treasury and three members appointed by the presidents of the National Assembly and the Senate for their financial or economic experience. The Committee has set up four specialised advisory committees to assist it in its work: the Savings Funds Committee, the Audit & Risks Committee, the Investment Committee and the Nominations Committee. The Supervisory Committee sets an annual maximum limit for issues of debt instruments by Caisse des Dépôts. The Committee deliberates on the reports submitted to it by the Banking Commission in the latter's role as the supervisory authority for banks. Every year, the Chairman of the Supervisory Committee submits a report to Parliament on the financial position of Caisse des Dépôts. The Supervisory Committee elects its chairman among the members of the Parliament in the Committee: Henri Emmanuelli since 9 July 2012.

The chief executive officer

The chief executive officer is responsible for administering the institution's funds and assets and is assisted both by Caisse des Dépôts' Management Committee and by the Group Management Committee, both of which he chairs. The chief executive officer of Caisse des Dépôts, appointed for a period of five years by decree of the President of the French Republic, takes an oath of office before the Supervisory Committee. Éric Lombard has served as its CEO since 2017.

The General Cashier

The General Cashier is the head of back-office operations. He is responsible for ensuring segregation between decision-making and execution, as required by the operating rules applicable to financial and State-owned institutions. The General Cashier performs transactions involving securities and cash, values portfolios and ensures that transactions are accounted for separately.

References

External links 

 Official website

1816 establishments in France
Government of France
Banks of France
European investment banks
Mass media companies